Stone House is a locality at Dent Head on the River Dee, in the county of Cumbria, England, to the south-east of Cowgill and to the north-west of Newby Head.

Stone House has a farm and a public house and is near the Artengill viaduct on the Settle-Carlisle line.

References 

Hamlets in Cumbria
Dent, Cumbria